Cacia bispinosa is a species of beetle in the family Cerambycidae. It was described by Per Olof Christopher Aurivillius in 1911 and is known from Borneo.

References

Cacia (beetle)
Beetles described in 1911